Miloš Ostojić (born 3 August 1991) is a Serbian professional footballer who plays as a centre-back for Spartak Subotica.

Club career

Teleoptik
Like many other promising youngsters at the club, Ostojić spent time at FK Teleoptik, making his debut in Serbia's second-tier league on 22 August 2009 against FK Novi Pazar. He went on to play 38 games for the club, scoring 4 goals in the process.

Partizan
On 24 January 2012, along with Miloš Jojić, Ostojić signed his first professional contract with Partizan, on a four-year deal. He made his debut for Partizan against FK Javor Ivanjica on 14 April 2012. He suffered from a tumour in 2015 and underwent injury in December that year, amongst other injuries.

He was released from Partizan at the end of the 2015–16 season due to persistent injuries.

BATE Borisov
On 28 February 2017, Ostojić signed a contract with Belarusian Premier League club FC BATE Borisov. After only 1 played game and five months spent at the club, he decided to leave BATE in July 2017.

Napredak Kruševac
In January 2018, six months after leaving BATE Borisov, Ostojić signed a contract with FK Napredak Kruševac. He made his debut for Napredak on 23 February 2018, in a 3–2 away league loss against FK Voždovac.

Ostojić scored his first and only goal for Napredak on 1 May 2019, in a 5–2 away league loss against FK Čukarički. He left Napredak on 1 July 2019, after his contract with the club expired.

Čukarički
On 6 August 2019, Ostojić signed a one year contract with Čukarički.

International career
Ostojić represented the Serbia U19 national team in 2009. He made his debut and played his only game for the Serbia U19 team on 26 August 2009, in a 2–0 home friendly match win against Bosnia and Herzegovina.

Career statistics

Club

Honours

Player

Club
Partizan
Serbian SuperLiga: 2011–12, 2012–13, 2014–15
Serbian Cup: 2015–16

BATE Borisov
Belarusian Super Cup: 2017

References

External links
Miloš Ostojić at Sofascore

1991 births
Living people
Sportspeople from Mitrovica, Kosovo
Serbian footballers
Association football defenders
FK Teleoptik players
FK Partizan players
FC BATE Borisov players
FK Napredak Kruševac players
FK Čukarički players
FK Liepāja players
FK Spartak Subotica players
Serbian SuperLiga players
Serbian First League players
Belarusian Premier League players
Latvian Higher League players
Serbian expatriate footballers
Expatriate footballers in Belarus
Serbian expatriate sportspeople in Belarus
Expatriate footballers in Latvia
Serbian expatriate sportspeople in Latvia